Bang Bang Rock & Roll is the debut studio album by British rock band Art Brut. It was re-released in 2006 with bonus CD.

Reception

Bang Bang Rock & Roll was released to highly positive reviews from music critics; on the review aggregator site Metacritic, the album holds a score of 83, indicating "universal acclaim". The music review online magazine Pitchfork placed Bang Bang Rock & Roll at number 192 on their list of top 200 albums of the 2000s.

Track listing

A hidden track; "Subliminal Desire for Adventure", can be found in the pregap of the CD. The first track must be rewound to hear the song.

In other media

The first track from the album, "Formed a Band" was featured on the video game FIFA Street 2, as well as an episode of ITV's Lewis, the popular Inspector Morse spin-off. An earlier version of the song had previously been released on "The New Cross: An Angular Sampler", a compilation album released by Angular Records in 2003; and as a single on Rough Trade Records in 2004.

"Moving to L.A." was featured on "Bring Your Own Poison: The Rhythm Factory sessions". The single 'Good Weekend' has been featured on the Channel 4 programme Skins as well as the romantic comedy Good Luck Chuck. Although it wasn't released as a single, the album track "Fight!" was used in British teen soap Hollyoaks, while the album's title track, "Bang Bang, Rock & Roll", was featured on the Xbox 360 video game Saints Row as well as the 2012 Chevrolet "Chevy Sonic" Super Bowl Commercial. It was also covered by the American indie rock band We Are Scientists on their 2006 b-sides album Crap Attack.

Credits

Eddie Argos - vocals
Ian Catskilkin - Guitar
Chris Chinchilla - Guitar
Freddy Feedback - Bass guitar
Mike Breyer - drums

References

2005 debut albums
Art Brut albums
Fierce Panda Records albums